The Clinton Journal is a twice-weekly newspaper that caters to readers in the town of Clinton, Illinois and its surrounding areas. Originally known as the Daily Public, the Journal has been the major newspaper in Clinton since the mid-19th century. Its offices are now located at 111 S. Monroe Street, right off the downtown square.

The Journal is a part of News Media Corporation, a group that owns several newspapers in Illinois, West Virginia and Oregon. In addition to the Journal, the Rochelle News Leader, The Ogle County LIFE and The Mendota Reporter are Illinois newspapers that are owned by NewsMedia Corporation.

The Journal is published twice a week, each Tuesday and Friday. In addition, a Saturday Advertiser is published. Special "tab" sections of the Journal are published throughout the year. They include a pamphlet on the famous Apple and Pork Festival, a Clinton traveler for each season, and a Sports Preview section prior to the fall, winter and spring sports seasons.

Competitors include The Pantagraph, the Farmer City Journal and the Herald & Review.

References

External links
Official website

Newspapers published in Illinois
DeWitt County, Illinois